Manola Brunet India (born 1955 in Cariñena) is a Spanish geographer who specializes in climate change. Since April 2018, she has presided over the Climatology Commission of the World Meteorological Organization, being the first woman to head the commission.

Life 
She graduated from University of Barcelona. She was a professor at University of Barcelona.

She is a professor of Climatology at the Rovira i Virgili University and director of the Center for Climate Change.

References 

Spanish geographers
1955 births
Living people

Women climatologists
World Meteorological Organization people
Academic staff of the University of Barcelona